Bayrampaşa—Maltepe is a rapid transit station on the M1 line of the Istanbul Metro. It is located in southern Eyüp, adjacent to the O-3 highway. An out-of-system connection Demirkapı station on the T4 light rail line is available  as well as İETT buses.

History
Bayrampaşa—Maltepe was opened on 3 September 1989 as part of the first rapid transit line in Istanbul as well as Turkey and is one of the six original stations of the M1 line.

On 1 December 2015  there was a bomb blast on an overpass near the metro.

Layout

References

Railway stations opened in 1989
1989 establishments in Turkey
Istanbul metro stations
Bayrampaşa